A number of steamships have been named Royston Grange, including:

Ship names